Gelonieae is a flowering plant of tribe of the subfamily Crotonoideae, under the family Euphorbiaceae (spurge family). It comprises 2 genera.

See also
 Taxonomy of the Euphorbiaceae

References

Crotonoideae
Euphorbiaceae tribes